Talk Is Cheap is the debut solo album by English musician Keith Richards, the guitarist of the Rolling Stones, released in 1988. Recorded and released during a long-standing falling out with Mick Jagger, Talk Is Cheap received positive reviews upon its release.

Background
Relations between Jagger and Richards had grown tense into the third decade of the Rolling Stones as they began to disagree on the musical direction of the band; "You Don't Move Me" would be written about their feud. The image-conscious Jagger was keen to follow the trends and keep the Rolling Stones current, while Richards wanted to preserve their reputation and roots. When Jagger was more interested in pursuing his solo career instead of touring for Dirty Work in 1986, Richards began a solo project for the first time.

Richards teamed up with Steve Jordan, who had worked on Dirty Work, and the pair wrote several new songs. One of which, "Almost Hear You Sigh", would be placed on the Rolling Stones' Steel Wheels in 1989 (with lyric modifications by Jagger). Recording began in August 1987 at Le Studio in Morin Heights, Quebec, and continued sporadically until the following May with visits to Montserrat and Bermuda. In order to assert his independence further, Richards signed with Virgin Records, while the Rolling Stones were under contract to Sony Music (they followed him to Virgin in 1993).

The core of the band, called the X-Pensive Winos, consisted of Waddy Wachtel, Ivan Neville, Charley Drayton and Jordan, with many guest artists taking part in the recording, including Sarah Dash, Bootsy Collins, Maceo Parker, the Memphis Horns and Patti Scialfa, and the only musician from the Stones to appear, guitarist Mick Taylor. Outtakes later surfaced that included an eight-minute version of "Struggle" and two passes at "Almost Hear You Sigh", as well as two unreleased jams, the 14-minute "She Put the Mark on Me" and the 12-minute "Breakin'".

A live version of "Make No Mistake" performed at the Hollywood Palladium was later featured in an episode of The Sopranos and on the 2001 soundtrack album The Sopranos: Peppers & Eggs: Music from the HBO Original Series.

Reception

Released in October 1988, Talk Is Cheap was met with critical acclaim, with some reviews half-jokingly calling it the best Rolling Stones album in years. It peaked at No. 37 in the UK and No. 24 in the US, where it went gold.

Track listing
All tracks written by Keith Richards and Steve Jordan.

Standard edition
Side one
"Big Enough" – 3:17
"Take It So Hard" – 3:11
"Struggle" – 4:10
"I Could Have Stood You Up" – 3:12
"Make No Mistake" – 4:53
"You Don't Move Me" – 4:48

Side two
"How I Wish" – 3:32
"Rockawhile" – 4:38
"Whip It Up" – 4:01
"Locked Away" – 5:48
"It Means a Lot" – 5:22

2019 reissue bonus tracks 
"Blues Jam" (Keith Richards, Steve Jordan, Mick Taylor, Joey Spampinato, Johnnie Johnson, Chuck Leavell, Bobby Keys) – 4:39
"My Babe" (Willie Dixon) – 3:13
"Slim" (Richards, Jordan, Taylor, Spampinato, Johnson, Keys) – 10:18
"Big Town Playboy" (Little Johnny Jones) – 4:19
"Mark on Me" – 5:51
"Brute Force" – 4:00
The 2019 reissue features six previously unreleased tracks.

Personnel

The X-Pensive Winos

Keith Richards – lead vocals, guitar
Steve Jordan – drums, percussion, bass on "Take It So Hard", backing vocals
Sarah Dash – backing vocals, duet on "Make No Mistake"
Charley Drayton – bass guitar, drums on "Take It So Hard", backing vocals
Ivan Neville – piano, keyboards, backing vocals
Bobby Keys – tenor saxophone on "I Could Have Stood You Up" and "Whip It Up"
Waddy Wachtel – acoustic, electric, and slide guitar, production consultant, backing vocals

Additional musicians
Bootsy Collins – bass guitar on "Big Enough"
Michael Doucet – violin on "Locked Away"
Stanley "Buckwheat" Dural – accordion on "You Don't Move Me", "Rockawhile" and "Locked Away"
Johnnie Johnson – piano on "I Could Have Stood You Up"
Chuck Leavell – organ on "I Could Have Stood You Up"
Maceo Parker – alto saxophone on "Big Enough"
Joey Spampinato – bass guitar on "I Could Have Stood You Up" and "Rockawhile"
Mick Taylor – guitar on "I Could Have Stood You Up"
Bernie Worrell – organ on "Big Enough" and "You Don't Move Me", clavinet on "Make No Mistake" and "Rockawhile"
The Memphis Horns (Jimmi Kinnard, Andrew Love, Ben Cauley, Gary Topper, Jack Hale, James Mitchell) – horns on "Make No Mistake"
Patti Scialfa – backing vocals
Willie Mitchell – horn arrangements

Production
Keith Richards – producer
Steve Jordan – producer
Robert Berry – engineer, assistant engineer
Joe Blaney – engineer
David Dorn – engineer, assistant engineer
Richard Ealey – engineer, assistant engineer
Joe Ferla – engineer
David Kennedy – engineer
Paul Milner – engineer, assistant engineer
Julio Pena – engineer, assistant engineer
Don Smith – engineer, mixing
Roger Talkov – engineer, assistant engineer
Joe Blaney – mixing
Greg Calbi – mastering
Sante D'Orazio - cover photography

Charts

Weekly charts

Certifications

References

1988 debut albums
Keith Richards albums
Virgin Records albums
Albums recorded at Le Studio